Ken Osborne (born 26 September 1948 – 3 January 2016) was an Australian rules footballer who played with Melbourne in the Victorian Football League (VFL).

Notes

External links 

1948 births
2016 deaths
Australian rules footballers from Victoria (Australia)
Melbourne Football Club players